Cool Croc Twins is a platform game developed by Arcade Masters and published by Empire Software for the Amiga, Atari ST, Commodore 64, and DOS in 1991. The player controls one of two crocodile twins named "Funk" and "Punk" respectively in an attempt to rescue a crocodile girl.

Information
The main characters of the game are Punk and Funk Croc. They are the suitors of the croquette, Daisy. The game is played in a screen by screen and level to level challenges in order to get Daisy. There is a cute introduction to the game with SoundBlaster tunes. If the game is not being played in two-player, a computer plays as the second player.

Gameplay
In two-player mode, the gamers need to jump, bash, and catch upgrades faster than the competitor. In order to win the game, the player must light up all the light bulbs and bump them with the characters' head. If the bulb is hit three times it will completely light up, and when every bulb is lit up, the player can continue onto the next level. On the higher levels, some of the light bulbs are invisible. Gravity is not an issue in this game. Punk and Funk race to light their bulbs first in order to win. There are obstacles such as walls and blocks that block the route to get the light bulbs. The player can have three movements that include:
clockwise
counter clock-wise
jumping
mirrored movement
walking upside-down

References

1991 video games
Platform games
Amiga games
Atari ST games
Commodore 64 games
DOS games
Video games developed in France
Empire Interactive games

Fictional crocodilians
Cooperative video games
Fictional twins
Video games about reptiles